The Symphony No. 1 in D major, Op. 2, is a four-movement orchestral composition written from 1927 to 1928 by the Swedish composer Lars-Erik Larsson. A student piece, the symphony marked the conclusion of Larsson's composition studies at the Royal Swedish Academy of Music, at which he had matriculated in 1925. 

The work premiered in Stockholm on 27 April 1929 with Larsson conducting the conservatory orchestra. In response to mixed critical reviews, Larsson immediately withdrew the symphony after its premiere—a fate that, too, would later befall his Second (Op. 17, 1937) and Third (Op. 34, 1945) symphonies. (Reflecting, in a 1948 interview, on his penchant for self-criticism, Larsson explained that he was more talented at smaller, less-structured forms and described his symphonies unsympathetically: "In [them] I have said nothing special. Other people have said much better ... [they] belong in my opinion to [my] process of development".)

Structure
The First Symphony is in four movements. They are as follows:

Larsson's Symphony No. 1 remains unpublished; apparently, the manuscript is—according to the BIS records liner notes from its 1989 release—under the copyright-collecting auspices of the Swedish Performing Rights Society (STIM).

Recordings
The sortable table below lists commercially available recordings of the Symphony No. 1:

Notes, references, and sources

 
 

Symphonies by Lars-Erik Larsson
20th-century classical music
Classical music in Sweden
1928 compositions